Shaykh Mehmet 'Ádil was born on 29 March 1957 in Damascus, Shām. He is the successor and oldest son of Sultan-ul 'Awliyá Shaykh Muhammad Nazim 'Ádil al-Háqqaní and Hajjah Amina 'Ádil Sultan Hanim, and the current spiritual leader (grandshaykh) of the Haqqani branch of the Naqshbandi Sufi order.

Biography

Mehmet 'Ádil is of Turkish Cypriot descent. His father and guide Shaykh Muhammad Nazim 'Ádil al-Háqqaní ar-Rábbaní is of the lineage of the founder of the Qadiriyya tariqa, Abdul-Qadir Gilani, while his great grandmother is of the lineage of the founder of the Mawlawi tariqa, Mawlana Jalaluddin Rumi. According to the lineage in the Nāqib al-Ashraf records, his lineage goes back to the family of the Islamic Prophet Muhammad, and is ahl al-bayt from his father’s side. 

His mother, Hajja Amina Sultan, is the daughter of a Tatar family who migrated to Sham Sharif (the Levant), through Anatolia of the Ottoman Empire due to the start of anti-religious policies of Communist countries of the time. She is originally from the Orenburg Bakey town of the Republic of Tatarstan, a subject of the Russian Federation.

Shaykh Muhammed Mehmet 'Ádil spent his youth in Syria’s capital, Damascus, under the guidance of both Shaykh Abdullah Fa'izi ad-Daghestani and Shaykh Nazim 'Ádil al-Háqqaní ar-Rábbaní, training in the manner and discipline of the Naqshbandi tariqa. He received his Islamic education at the prestigious Mahd al-Fath al-Islami Institute in Damascus.  

Shaykh Nazim declared publicly before passing away that the person to succeed him, i.e. his khalifa, would be Shaykh Muhammad Mehmet 'Ádil. He took over the trust as the 41st Shaykh of the Naqshbandi Golden Chain with the passing of Shaykh Nazim to the Abode of Eternity on 7 May 2014 / 8 Rajab 1435.

Shaykh Mehmet 'Ádil resides in the village of Akbaba of Beykoz district, Istanbul, Turkey.

References

1957 births
Living people
Syrian Sufis
Naqshbandi order
Syrian emigrants to Turkey
Syrian emigrants to Cyprus
Syrian people of Turkish Cypriot descent